The following is a list of notable people diagnosed with ulcerative colitis.

References

Bibliography

 
 

Colitis
Ulcerative colitis